USS LST-471 was a United States Navy  used in the Asiatic-Pacific Theater during World War II. As with many of her class, the ship was never named. Instead, she was referred to by her hull designation.

Construction
LST-471 was laid down on 29 October 1942, under Maritime Commission (MARCOM) contract, MC hull 991, by Kaiser Shipyards, Vancouver, Washington; launched 3 December 1942; and commissioned on 11 March 1943.

Service history 
During World War II, LST-471 was assigned to the Asiatic-Pacific theater and participated in the following operations: the Lae occupation in September 1943; the Leyte operation in October and November 1944; the Lingayen Gulf landings in January 1945; the Mindanao Island landings in March 1945; and the Balikpapan operation in June and July 1945.

Following World War II, LST-471 returned to the United States and was decommissioned on 26 February 1946, and struck from the Navy list on 12 April, that same year. On 21 January 1948, the tank landing ship was sold to Hughes Bros., Inc., New York City, for scrap. She was beached during a storm while under tow off Rodanthe, North Carolina.

The wreck is located at

Honors and awards
LST-471 earned five battle stars for her World War II service.

Notes 

Citations

Bibliography 

Online resources

External links

 

1942 ships
Ships built in Vancouver, Washington
World War II amphibious warfare vessels of the United States
LST-1-class tank landing ships of the United States Navy
S3-M2-K2 ships
Ships of the Aleutian Islands campaign